Suzanne Caroline Kröger (born 6 June 1976) is a Dutch politician of the political party GroenLinks. Since October 2021, she serves as member of the House of Representatives as replacement of Bart Snels. She also served as member of the House of Representatives between 23 March 2017 and 31 March 2021.

She previously worked for Greenpeace, where she contributed to campaigns for protection of old-growth forests and prevention of climate change. She also worked in Indonesia for many years.

References 

Living people
1976 births
Politicians from Amsterdam
Members of the House of Representatives (Netherlands)
21st-century Dutch politicians
21st-century Dutch women politicians
GroenLinks politicians
People associated with Greenpeace